Baykalskoye is a rural locality (a selo) in Severo-Baykalsky District, Republic of Buryatia, Russia. The population was 675 as of 2010. There are 15 streets.

Geography 
Baykalskoye is located 68 km southwest of Nizhneangarsk (the district's administrative centre) by road. Zarechny is the nearest rural locality.

References 

Rural localities in Severo-Baykalsky District